Carolina Ballet is one of America's premier arts organizations, programming traditional ballets by legendary masters and new works by contemporary choreographers. The Ballet was launched as a professional company in 1998 under the direction of Founding Artistic Director Robert Weiss. In 2019, Zalman Raffael became the Artistic Director/CEO joined by Michele Weathers as executive director. For more than 20 years, Carolina Ballet has garnered critical praise from the national and international media, staged over 100 world premiere ballets, and in 2018, chartered the School of Carolina Ballet. Since its inaugural season in 1998, Carolina Ballet and this community have accomplished something remarkable. The company has grown from a budget of $1.2 million featuring sixteen dancers and five apprentices in three programs to a $6.0 million budget featuring 38 dancers in eight programs including the magical holiday tradition, The Nutcracker.

Mission Statement 
Carolina Ballet's vision is to remain one of the top ballet companies in America with national and international recognition, thus contributing to the enhanced reputation and ever-increasing quality of life in our community and the State of North Carolina.

Carolina Ballet's mission is to perform world-class professional ballet, entertaining and enlightening audiences in Raleigh, the Triangle region, the State of North Carolina, and beyond. It will accomplish this mission by:

 attracting, developing, and retaining excellent dancers and artistic personnel combined with a fiscally responsible management and board of directors;
 commissioning new works by innovative choreographers;
 presenting traditional ballets of legendary masters;
 educating current and future audiences through programs for school-aged children and other performance outreach activities.

History

Carolina Ballet, Inc. was founded in 1984 as Raleigh Dance Theatre, Inc. by Ann Vorus, owner of the Raleigh Dance Theatre.
As a student company, its purpose was to provide performance opportunities for students of the school. Over several years, both the school and the company grew in reputation and stature in its metamorphosis as Carolina Ballet Theatre, a pre-professional regional company under Ms. Vorus and her successor as artistic director, Mary LeGere. Performances of the company began to attract favorable notice from area dance critics. In the fall of 1993, Raleigh lawyer Ward Purrington suggested to Ms. Vorus and the Raleigh Dance Theatre board that the company aspire to professional status. Market research suggested a professional dance presence in the Triangle region was not only needed but desired as well.

Robert Weiss, a former principal dancer with New York City Ballet and past artistic director of Pennsylvania Ballet, was selected in April 1997 as the founding artistic director of the new professional company, known as Carolina Ballet, Inc.

Notable productions
 Handel's Messiah, choreography by Robert Weiss, premiering in 1998
 Beethoven, Janáček, J. Mark Scearce The Kreutzer Sonata, based on the Tolstoy novella, 2000
 Carl Orff, Carmina Burana, choreography by Lynne Taylor-Corbett, first performed in 2001
 Poulenc, Debussy, Chausson Monet Impressions, 2006
 Paul Moravec, Tempest Fantasy, based on William Shakespeare's The Tempest, 2007
 Robert Weiss, "Cinderella," music by Karl Moraski

Dancers 
Dancers of the Carolina Ballet, as of July 2021:

Principals 

 Jan Burkhard
 Kiefer Curtis
 Amanda Gerhardt
 Ashley Hathaway 
 Richard Krusch
 Marcelo Martinez
 Jayson Pescasio
 Alyssa Pilger
 Courtney Schenberger
 Margaret Severin-Hansen
 Yevgeny Shlapko

Soloists 

Sam Ainley
Taylor Ayotte
Kathleen Black
Luke Potgieter
Sokvannara Sar
McKenzie Van Oss
Lauren Wolfram

Corps de Ballet 

Kim Cockrell
Zoe D'Astolfo
Saskia de Muinck Keizer
Mia Domini
Laurel Dorn
Heather Duncan
Nicholas Fokine
Joseph Gerhardt
Braden Hart
Anthony Hoyos
Anna Ingold
Aaron Magee
Stephen Marshall
Ayla O'Day
Sofie Rose Peetoom
SarahAnne Perel
Rachel Robinson
Deirdre Scanlon
Bilal Smith
Anne Wright

References

External links
 Carolina Ballet Website

Dance in North Carolina
Ballet companies in the United States
Ballet schools in the United States
Culture of Raleigh, North Carolina
1997 establishments in North Carolina
Performing groups established in 1997
Tourist attractions in Raleigh, North Carolina